The accuracy landing event at the 2009 World Games in Kaohsiung was played from 17 to 21 July. 10 parachuters, from 9 nations, participated in the tournament. The competition took place at Kaohsiung Metropolitan Park.

Competition format
A total of six rounds were contested. Athlete with the lowest score is a winner.

Results

References

External links
 Results on IWGA website

Parachuting accuracy landing